Taner Adefemi Adu (born 22 February 1984 in London, England) is a professional basketball player who played college basketball for the University of New Orleans in the NCAA and is a former Plymouth Raiders and Essex Pirates player in the British Basketball League.  Taner currently has 11 caps for the England Basketball Team.

In 2010, Taner joined, Plymouth Raiders to play at point guard.

References

Now 

1984 births
Living people
New Orleans Privateers men's basketball players
Plymouth Raiders players
English men's basketball players
Basketball players from Greater London
British Basketball League players
Point guards
Black British sportsmen
British expatriate basketball people in the United States
Now he is a coach a sir George Monoux college for the men's basketball team